Western Tyers was a small town in the Gippsland region of eastern Victoria  (Australia), founded as a timber community in the late 19th century and at its peak home to around 500 residents. Whilst only one original house still stands it once possessed a school, post office and public hall. Until 1969 it was a functioning community but with the closure of the timber mill all the remaining residents left. The town site was bought privately in 1970 as freehold.

Western Tyers is about 180 kilometres east of Melbourne. It is located on the Western Tyers River, approximately 20 kilometres west of Erica. The nearby mountains form part of the Baw Baw Ranges, themselves forming part of the much larger Great Dividing Range.

References

Towns in Victoria (Australia)
Ghost towns in Victoria (Australia)